is a video game for the Super Famicom. It is the first title directed by Eiji Aonuma, and was published and released in Japan by Nintendo.

Plot synopsis
Long ago, the seas were ruled by treasure-seeking pirates. The most famous of
these was the legendary Captain Maverick, who supposedly left a great treasure known as "Marvelous", guarded by unsolvable puzzles and bizarre creatures. Countless adventurers have gone looking for the "Marvelous", but none have seen it
and returned alive. Many years later, a group of children on a field trip landed on the island, which was rumored to house the "Marvelous".

Main characters
Dion (ディオン) (in red and brown; age 12) – He is short but spirited. He is a fast runner and a good pitcher. His small size allows him to get into places where the other two boys will not fit. Putting him at the head of the team will make them walk faster.

Max (マックス) (in green; age 12) – He is the largest and strongest of the three. He likes to eat, but also likes to play soccer and swim. He is also a good boxer. He also can lift up heavy objects.

Jack (ジャック) (in blue and red; age 12) – He is the smartest of the three. He is good with his hands. He likes to build things and work with machines. He is a good jumper. He is taller than the others, which comes in handy if the player needs to get to something high.

Ms. Gina (ジーナ先生) – She is the teacher of the three boys.  She gave the boys a Leader Hat, which looks like a cowboy hat, but it helps them know who leads the group.  She also gave them a Whistle, which allows the leader to call and bring the other two boys back to him.

Gameplay
The game was influenced by The Legend of Zelda: A Link to the Past. The game has a top down viewpoint, and an additional cursor can be used to search objects on screen.

The player controls three boys across the land by the bird's-eye view.  A command window will pop up whenever the player encounter an object or person. The window will give the player choices on what to do with the person or thing, like picking up objects, talking, or reading.

The BS Marvelous games are based on the idea of stamp collecting. Stamps are obtained from non-player characters in the gameworld, but they must be retrieved in a specific order. Clues to the location of the next stamp are given in-game and via SoundLink voice. The goal is to collect as many stamps as possible in the time available. Players could compete against each other by sending in their scores to win prizes.

Development 
This was the first game directed by Eiji Aonuma. Aonuma wanted to work on a Zelda game ever since he had played The Legend of Zelda: A Link to the Past, and made Marvelous as close to Zelda as he could. The game uses the engine from The Legend of Zelda: A Link to the Past.

In a move which Aonuma attributes to his position on the Marvelous team, Miyamoto recruited him to join the development team for the Zelda series. Aonuma then worked on The Legend of Zelda: Ocarina of Time.

Release
Marvelous: Another Treasure Island was released on October 26, 1996, for the Super Famicom. The game was only released in Japan. The game was released late into the lifespan of the Super Famicom, when Nintendo was not investing into language localizations for the system outside of Japan. At this time, Nintendo wanted to focus instead on the newly released Nintendo 64. The poor sales of Earthbound is also cited as another reason.

BS Marvelous: Time Athletic was considered for re-release in 2003 as a stand-alone game that later became The Legend of Zelda spinoff title Tetra's Trackers. Although the stand-alone Tetra's Trackers was ultimately cancelled, the game's code was included in The Legend of Zelda: Four Swords+ (the Japanese version of The Legend of Zelda: Four Swords Adventures) as the Navi Trackers minigame. Among the oxbow code remaining in The Legend of Zelda: Four Swords+ can be found 3D character models for the original camp instructor from the BS Marvelous games as well as maps taken directly from BS Marvelous: Time Athletic.

Marvelous: Mōhitotsu no Takarajima was released on the Japanese Virtual Console for the Wii U on February 12, 2014. In 2016, a complete English language fan translation of the game was released.

Legacy 
In 2014, IGN placed the game as 118 on their list of 125 top Nintendo developed games of all time.

The Nintendo 3DS title The Legend of Zelda: Tri Force Heroes is considered to be a spiritual successor to Marvelous: Another Treasure Island.

Dion, Max and Jack appear as a singular unlockable "Spirit" in Super Smash Bros. Ultimate.

References

External links
Official Marvelous website

1996 video games
Japan-exclusive video games
Nintendo games
Nintendo Research & Development 2 games
Super Nintendo Entertainment System games
Video games developed in Japan
Virtual Console games
Virtual Console games for Wii U